The 2009–10 VfL Bochum season was the 72nd season in club history.

Review and events

Matches

Legend

Bundesliga

DFB-Pokal

Squad

Appearances and goals

Minutes played

Bookings

Transfers

Summer

In:

Out:

Winter

In:

Out:

Notes

Sources

External links
 2009–10 VfL Bochum season at Weltfussball.de 
 2009–10 VfL Bochum season at kicker.de 
 2009–10 VfL Bochum season at Fussballdaten.de 

Bochum
VfL Bochum seasons